Brigitte Dzogbenuku is a Ghanaian politician and beauty queen who won Miss Ghana 1990. During 2020, she was the presidential candidate for the Progressive People's Party.

Education 
Dzogbenuku had her secondary education at Wesley Girls High School in Cape Coast. She proceeded to the University of Ghana to obtain a Bachelor of Arts degree in Modern Languages.

Career 
Dzogbenuku is a columnist at the Graphic Communication Group Limited where she writes for Graphic Mirror under Manners Matter. She was formerly General Manager at the Aviation Social Center. She also worked with Ashanti Goldfields Corporation as well as SC Johnson Wax Ghana.

Awards and recognition 
Dzogbenuku won the Miss Ghana beauty pageant in 1990. She also won the Fortune/Goldman Sachs Women's Leadership Award in 2008.

References 

Year of birth missing (living people)
Living people
People educated at Wesley Girls' Senior High School
University of Ghana alumni
Progressive People's Party (Ghana) politicians
21st-century Ghanaian women politicians
Candidates for President of Ghana